The census in the United Kingdom is decennial, that is, held every ten years, although there is provision in the Census Act 1920 for a census to take place at intervals of five years or more. There are actually three separate censuses in the United Kingdom - in England and Wales, Scotland, and Northern Ireland, although they are often coordinated. From 1821 to 1911, the census included the whole of Ireland.

There have only been three occasions in Great Britain where the census has not been decennial: There was no census in 1941 due to the Second World War; a mini-census using a ten percent sample of the population was conducted on 24 April 1966; and the planned Scottish 2021 census was delayed to 2022 due to the impact of the COVID-19 pandemic. No census was held in Ireland in 1921, as a consequence of the Irish War of Independence; instead, Northern Ireland carried out a census in 1926, the first there for fifteen years. No census was carried out in Northern Ireland in 1931, but one was carried out in 1937.

Previous censuses

Published censuses
The census records which have been published relate to the occupants of each household on the date given below:

United Kingdom Census 1801 - Tuesday, 10 March 
United Kingdom Census 1811 - Monday, 27 May
United Kingdom Census 1821 - Monday, 28 May 
United Kingdom Census 1831 - Monday, 30 May
United Kingdom Census 1841 - Sunday, 6 June
United Kingdom Census 1851 - Sunday, 30 March
United Kingdom Census 1861 - Sunday, 7 April
United Kingdom Census 1871 - Sunday, 2 April
United Kingdom Census 1881 - Sunday, 3 April
United Kingdom Census 1891 - Sunday, 5 April
United Kingdom Census 1901 - Sunday, 31 March
United Kingdom Census 1911 - Sunday, 2 April
United Kingdom Census 1921 - Sunday, 19 June
National Registration Act 1939 - Friday, 29 September Second World War

Unpublished censuses
Under the 100-year closure rule established after the 1911 census was taken, information in later censuses will not be released until the dates stated.

Northern Ireland Census 1926 - Sunday, 18 April: The census returns were not transferred to the Public Record Office in Northern Ireland, and are believed to have been destroyed without authorisation, possibly as part of a World War II waste-paper campaign.
United Kingdom Census 1931 - Sunday, 26 April: carried out in England, Wales, and Scotland, but not Northern Ireland. The England and Wales census returns were destroyed in an accidental fire in 1942; the Scottish census returns were stored in Edinburgh, and survived. The scheduled publication date for the Scottish returns is 1 January 2032
Northern Ireland Census 1937 - Sunday, 28 February: Unlike the 1926 Northern Ireland census, the 1937 census records survive. (scheduled publication date 1 January 2038)
United Kingdom Census 1941 - no census taken due to World War II.
United Kingdom Census 1951 - Sunday, 8 April (scheduled publication date 1 January 2052)
United Kingdom Census 1961 - Sunday, 23 April (scheduled publication date 1 January 2062)
United Kingdom Census 1966 - Sunday, 24 April mini-census using a ten percent sample (publication date 1 January 2067)
United Kingdom Census 1971 - Sunday, 25 April  (scheduled publication date 1 January 2072)
United Kingdom Census 1981 - Sunday, 5 April  (scheduled publication date 1 January 2082)
United Kingdom Census 1991 - Sunday, 21 April  (scheduled publication date 1 January 2092)
United Kingdom Census 2001 - Sunday, 29 April  (scheduled publication date 1 January 2102)
United Kingdom Census 2011 - Sunday, 27 March (scheduled publication date 1 January 2112)
United Kingdom Census 2021 - carried out in England, Wales, and  Northern Ireland only on Sunday, 21 March (scheduled publication date 1 January 2122). It will be carried out in Scotland on 20 March 2022. (scheduled publication date 1 January 2123)

See also
Census of Ireland, 1911

References

Notes

Censuses
 
Censuses